Whistling tree may refer to:

 Hakea chordophylla, endemic to Australia
 Casuarina equisetifolia, native to Australia, SE Asia and Oceania